Rudrabhatta was an influential 12th-century Kannada poet in the court of the Hoysala Empire King Veera Ballala II(r.1173–1220 CE). According to Kannada language expert Narasimhacharya, the poet was also patronized by a minister of the King. The literary critic Mukherjee feels that after a century of literary revolution caused by the Veerashaiva poets, a benevolent atmosphere created by the king may have encouraged this Vaishnava writer and poet.

Magnum opus
Rudrabhatta was a Brahmin and a Smartha (believer of monistic philosophy). Based on the Sanskrit classic Vishnu Purana, he wrote the epic Jagannatha Vijaya  in the Champu metrical form (mixed prose-verse). The epic kavya (a narrative poem) describes the life of the Hindu god Krishna leading up to his fight with the demon Banasura. In this work, Rudrabhatta envisions the Hindu gods Hari (Vishnu), Hara (Shiva) and Brahma as one composite supreme deity (Parabrahma) who takes the form of the god Krishna (an avatar of Vishnu). According to Dalal, Rudrabhatta influenced later day notable Kannada poets such as Kumaravyasa and Lakshmisha, and Haridasa (carnatic music) composers such as Purandaradasa and Kanakadasa. The Kannada scholar L.S. Sheshagiri Rao feels Rudrabhatta was essentially a poet for the learned classes. However, according to the literary critic Shiva Kumar, though Rudrabhatta's form was ancient, his content is more medieval, making him a poet of transition in Kannada literature. Shiva Prakash and Dalal consider him adept at both the mainstream (marga) and the native (desi) styles of composition. Based on epigraphs from the period of Veera Ballala II, the scholar Narasimhacharya dates Jagannatha Vijaya to about 1180 CE.

According to the scholar Sreekantaiyya, based on internal evidence, the authorship of an important Sanskrit classic called Rasakalika is assignable to Rudrabhatta. According to him, references made by the later day Kannada poet Salva (1550 CE) in his writing Rasaratnakara gives the required evidence. Sreekantaiyya feels the author of a Sanskrit book (on love and aesthetics in poetry) called Sringaratilaka, who goes by the same name, is not the Rudrabhatta of the Hoysala court. According to Dalal, the author of Sringaratilaka belonged to the 10th century and also goes by the name Rudratta.  According to Sankaranarayanan, Rudrabhatta's Rasakalika played an important role in the development of Indian aesthetics. It was the source for poet Vidyanatha's work Prataparudriya. The poet Vasudeva quotes from Rasakalika in his comments on the writing Karpurmanjari by Rajasekhara. He feels that today's scholars have not fully recognized the influence of Rudrabhatta of the Hoysala court.

See also
Hoysala literature
Kannada literature

References
Citations

Bibliography

 Sastri, Nilakanta K.A. [1955] (2002). A history of South India from prehistoric times to the fall of Vijayanagar. New Delhi: Indian Branch, Oxford University Press. .
 Narasimhacharya, R (1988). History of Kannada Literature. New Delhi: Asian Educational Services. .
 Mukherjee, Sujit (1999). Dictionary of Indian Literature One: Beginnings - 1850. Oriental Blackswan, New Delhi. 
 Sreekantaiyya, K N. (2001). Indian Poetics. Sahitya Akademi, New Delhi. 
 Datta, Amaresh (1988) Encyclopaedia of Indian literature. Sahitya Akademi. New Delhi. 
 Shiva Prakash, H.S. (1997). "Kannada". Edited by Ayyappa Panicker. Medieval Indian Literature, An Anthology, Volume 1. Sahitya Akademi. New Delhi. 
 Dalal, Roshan. (2011). Hinduism: An Alphabetical Guide. Penguin Books. , 

History of Karnataka
Kannada poets
Hindu poets
12th-century Indian poets
Poets from Karnataka
Indian male poets